Sadie Hawkins may refer to:
 Sadie Hawkins, a fictional character in the American comic strip Li'l Abner
 Sadie Hawkins dance, a school dance in which female students invite male students
 "Sadie Hawkins" (Glee), an episode of the TV series Glee

See also
 Sadie Hawkins Day, a pseudo-holiday inspired by the fictional character